Aluche is a station on Line 5 of the Madrid Metro and line C-5 on Cercanías. It is located in fare Zone A. The station offers connection to Cercanías Madrid via Aluche railway station.

Aluche is one of the few Madrid Metro stations that is elevated instead of underground, and also one of the few Madrid Metro stations with an island platform instead of side platforms. It was originally a station on the Suburbano, which later became Line 10. However, when Line 10 was re-routed, Aluche became part of Line 5, where it remains today.

References 

Line 5 (Madrid Metro) stations
Railway stations in Spain opened in 1961